Swiss Nights Vol. 3 is a live album led by saxophonist Dexter Gordon recorded in Zurich in 1975 and released on the Danish SteepleChase label in 1979.

Reception

In his review for AllMusic, Scott Yanow said "The third of three CDs taken from tenor saxophonist Dexter Gordon's appearances at the 1975 Zurich Jazz Festival has more variety than the other two. ...With pianist Kenny Drew, bassist Niels Pedersen and drummer Alex Riel offering strong support, Dexter Gordon is heard in enthusiastic, hard-swinging form".

Track listing
 Introduction - 0:06 Bonus track on CD reissue 
 "Tenor Madness" (Sonny Rollins) - 12:29 Bonus track on CD reissue 
 "Jelly, Jelly" (Billy Eckstine) - 12:47
 "Didn't We?" (Jimmy Webb) - 9:08
 "Days of Wine and Roses" (Henry Mancini, Johnny Mercer) - 11:01 Bonus track on CD reissue  		
 "Sophisticated Lady" (Duke Ellington, Irving Mills, Mitchell Parish) - 9:30
 "Rhythm-a-Ning/The Theme" (Thelonious Monk/Traditional) - 10:31

Personnel
Dexter Gordon - tenor saxophone, vocals
Joe Newman - trumpet (track 5)
Kenny Drew - piano
Niels-Henning Ørsted Pedersen - bass 
Alex Riel - drums

References

1979 live albums
Dexter Gordon live albums
SteepleChase Records live albums